Kali the Mother may refer to:
 Kali the Mother (book), a book written by Sister Nivedita
 Kali the Mother (poem), a poem written by Swami Vivekananda